"Sing" is the first single by The Dresden Dolls duo, taken from the second studio album Yes, Virginia.... It was never released in shops, only as a promo for radio stations. The music video, directed by Michael Pope, prominently  featured living statues and centered on the plotline of a video of the Dresden Dolls playing the song being sent to various people in different locations and occupations. It also featured the band performing on a stage.

There are two versions of the song, the version on the final album with the opening lyric "There is this thing that's like touching except you don't touch", and the original version available on promo copies of the album which is identical, save an alternate opening lyric, "There is this thing that's like fucking except you don't fuck."

"Sing" also hit many top 50 modern rock charts in April, 2006.

The song was covered by The Red Paintings on their Feed the Wolf EP (2007).

The song was also covered by jazz vocalist and composer Veronica Swift on her 2021 album The Bitter Earth.

Personnel
Amanda Palmer - piano, vocals, lyricist, composer, songwriter
Brian Viglione - drums, guitar

Notes

External links
 Watch "Sing" (The Alternate Cut) on YouTube
 Watch "Sing" (Chapter II / Original) on YouTube
 The Dresden Dolls official site including lyrics and downloads
 Video Director's site including music video

2006 singles
The Dresden Dolls songs
2006 songs
Songs written by Amanda Palmer
Roadrunner Records singles